Hryhoriy Ishchenko (29 July 1946) is a former professional Soviet football defender and later Soviet and Ukrainian coach.

Starting at the sports school in Kropyvnytskyi (at that time Kirovohrad), over his playing career Ishchenko played for Soviet lower leagues' clubs. After becoming a head coach, Ishchenko managed quite few professional clubs in Ukraine.

Ishchenko's son Ihor Ishchenko is a former Ukrainian football referee.

References

External links
 

1946 births
Living people
Sportspeople from Kropyvnytskyi
Soviet footballers
Ukrainian footballers
FC Shakhtar Oleksandriya players
FC Zirka Kropyvnytskyi players
FC Avanhard Zhovti Vody players
FC Shakhtar Stakhanov players
FC Podillya Khmelnytskyi players
MFC Mykolaiv players
Soviet football managers
Ukrainian football managers
MFC Mykolaiv managers
FC Podillya Khmelnytskyi managers
FC Zirka Kropyvnytskyi managers
FC Karpaty Mukacheve managers
FC Advis Khmelnytskyi managers
FC Polissya Zhytomyr managers
FC Oleksandriya managers
Association football defenders